Bonella is an Australian surname. Notable people with the surname include:

 Jim Bonella (1884–1918), Australian rules footballer
 Rod Bonella (1937–2000), Australian long-distance runner and horse trainer

See also
 Bonelli
 Bonilla
 Gonella